Federal Highway 1 (Fed. 1) is a free (libre) part of the federal highway corridors of Mexico, and the highway follows the length of the Baja California Peninsula from Tijuana, Baja California, in the north to Cabo San Lucas, Baja California Sur, in the south. The road connects with Via Rapida, which merges into the American Interstate 5 (I-5) at the San Ysidro Port of Entry, which crosses the international border south of San Ysidro, California.

Most of its course, particularly south of Ensenada, is as a two-lane rural highway. Completed in 1973, Fed. 1's official name is the Benito Juárez Transpeninsular Highway, named in honor of Mexico's president during the country's 1860s invasion by France.

Route description
The road begins in the border city of Tijuana, where it continues northward as Interstate 5 at the San Ysidro Port of Entry. It is bypassed from here to Ensenada by Fed. 1D, a toll road. Then, the road continues south past Maneadero. Much of it follows or passes near the route of Portola's march from Loreto to San Diego during the establishment of the Spanish missions in Baja California.

Federal highway corridors in Mexico are generally designated with even numbers for east–west routes and odd numbers for north–south routes. Numerical designations usually ascend southward away from the U.S. border for east–west routes and usually ascend eastward away from the Pacific Ocean for north–south routes. Therefore, Fed. 1, due to its proximity to the Pacific Ocean, has the lowest possible odd number designation, and intersecting east–west federal highway corridors usually conform to this pattern.

Kilometer markers track the distance along Fed. 1 through Baja California in four separate improved segments. The first of these is the  length from Tijuana to Ensenada, which is known informally as Mex 1 Libre to distinguish it from Fed. 1D, the parallel toll road. The second portion of signed road runs  from Ensenada to San Quintín. The third segment comprises  from San Quintín to the Parador Punta Prieta junction. A final segment stretches  from Punta Prieta to the border of the state of Baja California Sur near Guerrero Negro.

Continuing south into the two Mexican states that comprise the Baja California peninsula, Guerrero Negro is the nearest community to the point where Fed. 1 meets the 28th parallel north.  Afterward Fed. 1 leaves the western coast and crosses to the eastern coast at Santa Rosalía.  The route continues southward past Puerto Escondido and gains altitude at Sierra de la Giganta, then veers southwest and through agricultural lands and Ciudad Constitución.  After crossing a desert the route encounters La Paz on the eastern coast.  The route continues along the gulf side of the peninsula through San José del Cabo to its terminus at Cabo San Lucas.

After crossing state lines the kilometer markers progress in the opposite direction. Baja California signage count from north to south, but Baja California Sur signage count from south to north.

This highway also goes under the Cross Border Xpress terminal in Tijuana.

Major intersections

Baja California
  United States–Mexico border (Tijuana)
  Playas de Rosarito
  Ensenada
  Maneadero
  San Quintín
  El Rosario
  Cataviña
  Fed. 12 to Bahía de los Ángeles
  Punta Prieta
  Rosarito
  Villa Jesús María and road to Sebastián Vizcaíno Bay
  State Line (28th parallel north)

Baja California Sur

  Guerrero Negro
  San Ignacio, road to San Ignacio Lagoon
  Santa Rosalía
  Mulegé
  Loreto
  Ciudad Insurgentes
  Ciudad Constitución
  La Paz
  San Pedro
  Fed. 19 to Todos Santos & El Pescadero; shortcut to Cabo San Lucas
  San Antonio
  Santiago
  Los Cabos International Airport (at airport exit)
  San José del Cabo - as Boulevard Mauricio Castro
  Los Cabos Corridor (at transpeninsular monument)
  Cabo San Lucas - as Boulevard Lázaro Cárdenas

001